An untitled The Last of Us game is in development by Naughty Dog. A multiplayer game set in the world of The Last of Us, the game is a follow-up to the multiplayer mode featured in the 2013 video game The Last of Us.

Development 
A multiplayer mode was originally in development for The Last of Us Part II (2020), as had been the case in The Last of Us (2013); Anthony Newman and Kurt Margenau, co-game directors of Part II, confirmed the existence of the multiplayer mode at E3 in June 2018. In September 2019, Part II creative director Neil Druckmann and co-lead game designer Emilia Schatz noted the game would focus solely on its single-player campaign; developer Naughty Dog released a statement confirming the omission, adding it continued development separately but "when and where it will be realized is still to be determined". Naughty Dog increased its multiplayer-related job openings following the release of Part II in 2020; co-game director Vinit Agarwal said the company was "aggressively hiring" for the game, which is its first standalone multiplayer project. At Summer Game Fest in June 2022, Druckmann confirmed the game would receive a standalone release, and revealed the first concept art. He said the game is "as big" as Naughty Dog's single-player games, and noted it will feature new characters and a new location in the United States, suspected to be San Francisco based on the concept art. The game's development is led by co-game directors Agarwal and Anthony Newman, and narrative lead Joseph Pettinati.

Giant Bombs Jeff Grubb claimed in June 2022 the game had been delayed as Naughty Dog was ambitious about it and wanted to spend time building the technology. He said it would be a live service game, allowing the developers to create and release new content without major updates. Job listings in October suggested the game would be free-to-play. Druckmann released a second piece of concept art in January 2023 and said more information would be revealed later in the year.

References 

Upcoming video games
Action-adventure games
Cannibalism in fiction
Fictional fungi
Horror video games
Multiplayer video games
Naughty Dog games
Post-apocalyptic video games
Sony Interactive Entertainment games
Stealth video games
Survival video games
The Last of Us
Third-person shooters
Video games about viral outbreaks
Video games about zombies
Video games developed in the United States
Video games set in the United States